Ingrid Maria Larsson (born 20 January 1956 in Långasjö) is Swedish politician of the Christian Democrats who served as Governor of Örebro County from May 2015 to December 2022, appointed by the cabinet of Stefan Löfven. She previously served as Minister for Children and the Elderly from 2010 to 2014 and as Minister for the Elderly and Public Health from 2006 to 2010. A member of the Christian Democrats, she was an MP of the Swedish Riksdag from 1998 to 2014.

Following the 2014 election defeat and her defeat from the Riksdag, Larsson announced that she will leave politics and step down as deputy party leader in 2015.

Career 
She is a trained schoolteacher, and is married with three children. She was a Member of Parliament from 1998 to 2014 representing Jönköping County, and deputy chairman of the Christian Democrats from 2003 to 2015.

References

External links 

Maria Larsson at the Riksdag website 
Maria Larsson (vice party leader) / Maria Larsson - MP at the Christian Democratic Party website 

1956 births
21st-century Swedish women politicians
Living people
Governors of Örebro County
Members of the Riksdag 1998–2002
Members of the Riksdag 2002–2006
Members of the Riksdag 2006–2010
Members of the Riksdag 2010–2014
Members of the Riksdag from the Christian Democrats (Sweden)
People from Emmaboda Municipality
Swedish feminists
Women county governors of Sweden
Women government ministers of Sweden
Women members of the Riksdag